Henry Kearney Boldero (31 March 1831 – 18 February 1900) was an English cleric and cricketer.

He was the second son of Henry George Boldero, and was educated at Harrow School. He matriculated at Trinity College, Cambridge in 1850, graduating B.A. in 1854. He was ordained deacon in 1855, and priest in 1856. He became rector of Yatton Keynell in 1856, and of Grittleton in 1864, presented by Sir John Neeld, 1st Baronet; Neeld was the brother of Henry George Boldero's second wife Mary Elizabeth Neeld.

Boldero played thirteen first-class matches for Cambridge University Cricket Club between 1851 and 1853.

See also
 List of Cambridge University Cricket Club players

References

External links
 

1831 births
1900 deaths
Alumni of Trinity College, Cambridge
19th-century English Anglican priests
English cricketers
Cambridge University cricketers
Marylebone Cricket Club cricketers
People educated at Harrow School
Sportspeople from Weymouth
Cricketers from Dorset